Palizan (also Romanized as Pālīzān; also known as Pālezān) is a village in Kahnuk Rural District, Irandegan District, Khash County, Sistan and Baluchestan Province, Iran. At the 2006 census, its population was 169, in 42 families.

References 

Populated places in Khash County